Estonia competed at the 1998 Winter Olympics in Nagano, Japan.

Biathlon

Men

Cross-country skiing

Men

Women

Figure skating

Luge

Nordic combined

References

Official Olympic Reports

External links
 EOK – Nagano 1998 

Nations at the 1998 Winter Olympics
1998
1998 in Estonian sport